Ryduan Palermo (born 24 July 1996) is an Argentine professional footballer as a centre-forward who currently plays for SS Villacidrese at the Eccellenza Sardinia.

Club career
Palermo came through the ranks at Estudiantes, prior to moving to Arsenal de Sarandí in early 2015. He wouldn't appear at senior level for them, though would make the substitute's bench once for a 2–1 defeat away to Newell's Old Boys on 27 January 2018. In the succeeding August, Palermo headed out on loan to Chilean football with Santiago Morning. He debuted in a 4–0 loss away to Cobresal on 19 August, having replaced Diego Cerón after fifty-five minutes. Five further appearances arrived, which culminated with the centre-forward netting his first senior goal in his last match on 8 November against Cobresal.

Palermo terminated his Arsenal contract on 4 July 2019, subsequently securing a contract with Liga Premier de México side Tlaxcala. He scored on debut in a win over Reboceros de La Piedad on 24 August, with further goals following in 2019–20 against Atlético San Luis Premier and Irapuato (2). He also featured twice in the Torneo Internacional Premier, which they won. In September 2020, Palermo switched Mexico for Honduras after joining Marathón of Liga Nacional. His first appearance arrived in a draw away to Honduras Progreso on 3 October, almost two months before his first goal came in a 3–0 win over Platense.

International career
In March 2012, Palermo was called up by the Argentina U17s by manager Walter Perazzo.

Personal life
Ryduan is the son of former Argentina international footballer Martín Palermo and Brazilian model Jaqueline Dutra.

Career statistics
.

Honours
Tlaxcala
Torneo Internacional Premier: 2019

References

External links

1996 births
Living people
Footballers from La Plata
Argentine people of Brazilian descent
Argentine people of Italian descent
Argentine footballers
Association football forwards
Argentina youth international footballers
Argentine expatriate footballers
Expatriate footballers in Chile
Expatriate footballers in Mexico
Expatriate footballers in Honduras
Argentine expatriate sportspeople in Chile
Argentine expatriate sportspeople in Mexico
Argentine expatriate sportspeople in Honduras
Primera B de Chile players
Liga Premier de México players
Liga Nacional de Fútbol Profesional de Honduras players
Arsenal de Sarandí footballers
Santiago Morning footballers
Tlaxcala F.C. players
C.D. Marathón players